Ithaanente Vazhi is a 1978 Indian Malayalam film, directed by M. Krishnan Nair and produced by Sharada. The film stars Madhu, Sharada, Jose Prakash and Sreemoolanagaram Vijayan in the lead roles. The film has musical score by K. J. Joy. The film was a remake of the 1972 Telugu film Manavudu Danavudu.

Cast
Madhu as Vijayan / Karimpuli Bhargavan (Double Roll)
Sharada as Malathi 
Jose Prakash as Menon
Sreemoolanagaram Vijayan as Vasu
Bahadoor as Gopi
Jayamalini 
Manimala as Seetha
Philomina as Beevi Umma
Sadhana 
Vijayalalitha as Sarasa
TP Madhavan as police inspector
 Sam
 Lissy

Soundtrack
The music was composed by K. J. Joy and the lyrics were written by Bichu Thirumala.

References

External links
 

1978 films
1970s Malayalam-language films
Films directed by M. Krishnan Nair
Malayalam remakes of Telugu films